Tu Nedhé-Wiilideh is a territorial electoral district in the Northwest Territories, Canada, which elects one member to the Legislative Assembly of the Northwest Territories. The district consists of the communities of N'Dilo, Lutselk'e, Fort Resolution and Dettah. It had an estimated population of 1,412 in 2012.

The district was created in 2013 when the ridings of Tu Nedhe and Weledeh were merged. It was first contested in the 2015 Northwest Territories general election.

Members of the Legislative Assembly (MLAs) 

Steve Norn was elected in the 2019 territorial election, but in late 2021 became the first MLA to be removed from the Legislature by his colleagues. This event was a consequence of Norn's refusal to follow Covid-19 protocols, and subsequent actions on his part against his colleagues during the ensuing investigation. He had attempted to resign prior to this vote, but the Speaker rejected it. The seat remained vacant until by-election took place the following year. Norn ran in the by-election but was defeated by Richard Edjericon.

Election results

2022 election

2019 election

2015 election

References

External links 
Website of the Legislative Assembly of Northwest Territories

Northwest Territories territorial electoral districts